Morsemere is a neighborhood in Bergen County, New Jersey, United States, largely in the northern part of Ridgefield and straddling the border of Palisades Park south of start of U.S. Route 46.

History
Morsemere is named for Samuel Morse, who had bought property with the intention of building a home there, but died before doing so. His estate was subdivided and laid out from 1899 to 1902. It underwent massive expansion around 1910.

The eponymous Morsemere Church was completed in 1928. The locally founded Morsemere Trust Company was eventually subsumed by MetroCorp Bancshares.

Until the 1950s when dial telephone service arrived, the local exchange was MOrsemere 6.

The Erie Railroad Northern Branch had a station in the neighborhood as well as at Ridgefield. The station house, built when the community was developed, burn down in 1928.

See also
Grantwood, New Jersey

References

Palisades Park, New Jersey
Ridgefield, New Jersey
Unincorporated communities in Bergen County, New Jersey
Unincorporated communities in New Jersey